The 2014 Portland State Vikings football team represented Portland State University in the 2014 NCAA Division I FCS football season. They were led by fifth year head coach Nigel Burton and played their home games at Providence Park. They were a member of the Big Sky Conference. They finished the season 3–9, 2–6 in Big Sky play to finish in a three-way tie for tenth place.

On November 26, head coach Nigel Burton was fired. He finished at Portland State with a five-year record of 21–36.

Schedule

Despite also being a member of the Big Sky Conference, the game with Cal Poly on September 20 is considered a non conference game and will have no effect on the Big Sky Standings.

Game summaries

@ Oregon State

Western Oregon

@ Washington State

@ Cal Poly

UC Davis

@ North Dakota

Northern Arizona

@ Weber State

Idaho State

@ Montana State

@ Sacramento State

Eastern Washington

References

Portland State
Portland State Vikings football seasons
Portland State Vikings football
Portland State Vikings football